The 2020 Miami FC season will be the club's first season following the sale of the franchise rights of the Ottawa Fury FC to ownership in Miami, Florida. The side will participate in the USL Championship, the second-tier of American soccer.

Roster 

Appearances and goals are career totals from all-competitions and leagues.

Staff
  Paul Dalglish – Interim head coach
  Paul Crichton – Assistant coach
  Anthony Hazelwood – Assistant coach
  Chris Spendlove – Assistant coach

Transfers

In

Out

Friendlies

Competitive

USL Championship

Standings — Group H

Results summary

Match results
In the preparations for the resumption of league play following the shutdown prompted by the COVID-19 pandemic, Miami's schedule was announced on July 2.

U.S. Open Cup 

As a USL Championship club, Miami FC will enter the competition in the Second Round, to be played April 7–9.

Squad statistics

Appearances and goals 

|-
! colspan="16" style="background:#dcdcdc; text-align:center"| Goalkeepers

|-
! colspan="16" style="background:#dcdcdc; text-align:center"| Defenders

|-
! colspan="16" style="background:#dcdcdc; text-align:center"| Midfielders

|-
! colspan="16" style="background:#dcdcdc; text-align:center"| Forwards

|-
|}

Goal scorers

Disciplinary record

References

Miami FC
Miami FC
Miami FC seasons
Miami FC